The Grand Alliance for National Unity (GANA) is a political party in El Salvador.  The party established itself on 16 January 2010 and was recognized by the Supreme Electoral Court of El Salvador on 19 May of the same year.

The majority of party members came from the ARENA. Originally the defection from ARENA included 12 deputies in the Legislative Assembly, but this number has grown to 16. GANA ranks third in seats in the assembly with 11, after the FMLN's 31 and the ARENA's remaining 28. There have been accusations of ARENA members being bought or blackmailed by the GANA party in order to secure them in their party. GANA has also been accused of multiple cases of corruption.

On June 1, 2019, Nayib Bukele under the banner of the GANA party became the first president of El Salvador since José Napoleón Duarte to come from outside of the two major political parties in El Salvador, the ARENA and FMLN. Bukele is also the first president to be elected while a part of GANA.

Electoral history

Presidential elections

Legislative Assembly elections

References

External links 
 Website of GANA

Political parties in El Salvador
Political parties established in 2010
2010 establishments in North America
Social conservative parties
Nayib Bukele